Maria Alejandra Delfino (born February 20, 1981), known professionally as Majandra Delfino, is an American actress and singer. She is best known for her role as Maria DeLuca on Roswell, and as Andi on the CBS sitcom Friends with Better Lives.

Early life
Delfino was born on February 20, 1981, in Caracas, Venezuela. Her father, Enrique Delfino, is Italian Venezuelan, and her mother, Mary Hellmund, is Cuban. As a child, she lived in Caracas and Miami, Florida, before moving to Los Angeles as a teenager.

Delfino's stage name, Majandra, is an amalgamation of her forenames, Maria Alejandra. It originated as a mispronunciation of her sister's that her family adopted as her nickname.

Career

Acting
Delfino was cast in MGM's Zeus & Roxanne before winning the role of Tina Dimeo in NBC's The Tony Danza Show, where she played Danza's teenage daughter. After playing Natalie Sanford in the independent film The Secret Life of Girls, Delfino was cast as Maria DeLuca on Roswell. On hiatus, she performed in the small role of Vanessa in Traffic. She also acted in Reeseville, Celeste in the City, R.S.V.P. and State's Evidence.

Delfino starred in a number of episodes of the NBC show Quarterlife, also shown on MySpaceTV, which started airing November 11, 2007. In 2011, she starred with Raven-Symoné in the show State of Georgia on ABC Family until its cancellation.

Delfino performed in ABC's pilot The Family Trap starring Mandy Moore and Stockard Channing. She was eight months pregnant with her first child during the shooting, so director Shawn Levy shot around the pregnancy for the entire project. One month after giving birth, Delfino was cast as Dwight Schrute's sister on NBC's The Office attempted spin-off, The Farm. NBC did not greenlight the series.

Delfino starred in CBS's Friends with Better Lives, where writers included her pregnancy in the storyline.

Music
Delfino sang in several Roswell episodes, such as "Viva Las Vegas", "Cry Your Name" and "Behind the Music". In the summer of 2000, she released three songs onto the internet, "Siren", "Bruises" and "Tattoo", written and produced in association with "Sci-Fi Lullaby." On October 31, 2001, she released the EP The Sicks on her own label, Dripfeed, without radio or television airplay.

Her second album, Tarte, was released on April 23, 2007 by her own record company, Red Velvet Cake Records. In February 2011, she announced via Twitter that she was working on her third studio album, scheduled for a late 2018 release.

Personal life
Delfino was in a relationship with her Roswell  co-star and on-screen love interest Brendan Fehr from 2000 to 2002. The two were briefly engaged before parting ways.  In 2007, Delfino married Devon Gummersall, who also appeared alongside her in several Roswell episodes as her character's cousin, Sean DeLuca.  Their marriage was short-lived, the two divorcing the following year. On March 18, 2011, Delfino married actor David Walton in Miami. They have two children, a daughter born in 2012, and a son born in 2013.

Delfino is the younger sister of actress Marieh Delfino.

Discography
The Sicks (EP) (2001) Dripfeed
Le Prince Bleu D'Arthelius (2003) (CD single duet with RoBERT)
Tarte (2007) RVC Records

Film and television credits

References

External links
 
 

1981 births
Living people
20th-century American actresses
21st-century American actresses
Actresses from Caracas
Actresses from Miami
American television actresses
American film actresses
American women singer-songwriters
American people of Italian descent
American singer-songwriters
American people of Cuban descent
Dark cabaret musicians
Hispanic and Latino American actresses
Venezuelan emigrants to the United States
21st-century American singers
21st-century American women singers
Women punk rock singers